Locke House may refer to:

in the United States (by state then city)
Esther Locke House, Hardy, Arkansas, listed on the National Register of Historic Places (NRHP) in Sharp County
Locke-Nall House, Lockesburg, Arkansas, listed on the NRHP in Sevier County
Locke House and Barn, Lockeford, California, listed on the NRHP in San Joaquin County
Locke House (Oakland, California), listed on the National Register of Historic Places in Alameda County
Locke-Mount House, Goshen, Kentucky, listed on the NRHP in Oldham County
Capt. Benjamin Locke House, Arlington, Massachusetts, listed on the NRHP
Charles Adams-Woodbury Locke House, Somerville, Massachusetts, listed on the NRHP in Middlesex County
Locke-Baldwin-Kinsley House, Stoneham, Massachusetts, listed on the NRHP
Asa Locke House, Winchester, Massachusetts, listed on the NRHP
Capt. Josiah Locke House, Winchester, Massachusetts, listed on the NRHP
Philemon Wright/Asa Locke Farm, Winchester, Massachusetts, listed on the NRHP
Elijah Locke House, Rye, New Hampshire, listed on the NRHP in Rockingham County
Hadley-Locke House, Corvallis, Oregon, listed on the NRHP in Benton County
Locke House (Decatur, Tennessee), formerly listed on the National Register of Historic Places in Meigs County